John Arthur "Chubby" Cox III (born December 29, 1955) is an American former professional basketball player. Cox was drafted by the Chicago Bulls in the 1978 NBA draft and played for the Washington Bullets for one season. He played college basketball for the Villanova Wildcats and San Francisco Dons.

Life and career
Cox was born in Philadelphia, Pennsylvania. A 6'2" guard, Cox attended Roxborough High School in Philadelphia. He played two years at Villanova University and then starred at the University of San Francisco (USF), where he still ranks among the Top 10 in single-season assists.

He was drafted in the 8th round (7th pick) by the NBA's Chicago Bulls in 1978. However, Cox did not make an NBA roster until the 1982–83 season, when he played seven games for the Washington Bullets, scoring 29 total points.

Cox played professionally in the Continental Basketball Association (CBA) from 1978 to 1981. Over three seasons with the Philadelphia Kings, Pennsylvania Barons, and Wilkes-Barre Barons, Cox averaged nearly 22 points per game. He scored 50 points in a December 28, 1979 game against the Lancaster Red Roses. He also played professionally in Venezuela for Beverley Hills in Caracas.
 
Cox married his girlfriend, and former University of San Francisco cheerleader, Victoria and together they have an American-Venezuelan son, John, who plays professional basketball in Venezuela, where he was born.

Cox's brother-in-law is former NBA player Joe Bryant and his nephew is Naismith Memorial Basketball Hall of Famer Kobe Bryant.

References

External links
 Basketball Reference: Chubby Cox career statistics

1955 births
Living people
African-American basketball players
American expatriate basketball people in Venezuela
American men's basketball players
Basketball players from Philadelphia
Bryant family
Chicago Bulls draft picks
Philadelphia Kings players
Point guards
San Francisco Dons men's basketball players
Shooting guards
Villanova Wildcats men's basketball players
Washington Bullets players
Wilkes-Barre Barons players